Plasma parameters define various characteristics of a plasma, an electrically conductive collection of charged particles that responds collectively to electromagnetic forces. Plasma typically takes the form of neutral gas-like clouds or charged ion beams, but may also include dust and grains. The behaviour of such particle systems can be studied statistically.

Fundamental plasma parameters 
All quantities are in Gaussian (cgs) units except energy and temperature which are in electronvolts. The ion mass is expressed in units of the proton mass  and  the ion charge in units of the elementary charge  (in the case of a fully ionized atom,  equals to the respective atomic number). The other physical quantities used are the Boltzmann constant, speed of light, and the Coulomb logarithm.

Frequencies

Lengths

Velocities

Dimensionless 

 number of particles in a Debye sphere 
 Alfvén speed to speed of light ratio 
 electron plasma frequency to gyrofrequency ratio 
 ion plasma frequency to gyrofrequency ratio 
 thermal pressure to magnetic pressure ratio, or beta, β 
 magnetic field energy to ion rest energy ratio

Collisionality
In the study of tokamaks, collisionality is a dimensionless parameter which expresses the ratio of the electron-ion collision frequency to the banana orbit frequency.

The plasma collisionality  is defined as

Electron temperature
Temperature is a statistical quantity whose formal definition is 

or the change in internal energy with respect to entropy, holding volume and particle number constant. A practical definition comes from the fact that the atoms, molecules, or whatever particles in a system have an average kinetic energy. The average means to average over the kinetic energy of all the particles in a system.

If the velocities of a group of electrons, e.g., in a plasma, follow a Maxwell–Boltzmann distribution, then the electron temperature is defined as the temperature of that distribution. For other distributions, not assumed to be in equilibrium or have a temperature, two-thirds of the average energy is often referred to as the temperature, since for a Maxwell–Boltzmann distribution with three degrees of freedom, .

The SI unit of temperature is the kelvin (K), but using the above relation the electron temperature is often expressed in terms of the energy unit electronvolt (eV). Each eV is equivalent to 11,605 kelvins, which can be calculated by the relation .

The electron temperature of a plasma can be several orders of magnitude higher than the temperature of the neutral species or of the ions. This is a result of two facts. Firstly, many plasma sources heat the electrons more strongly than the ions. Secondly, atoms and ions are much heavier than electrons, and energy transfer in a two-body collision is much more efficient if the masses are similar. Therefore, equilibration of the temperature happens very slowly, and is not achieved during the time range of the observation.

See also
List of plasma physics articles
 Ball-pen probe
 Langmuir probe

References

NRL Plasma Formulary – Naval Research Laboratory (2018)

Plasma physics
Astrophysics